Membracis is a genus of treehoppers in the family Membracidae. There are more than 50 described species in Membracis.

Species
These 51 species belong to the genus Membracis:

 Membracis albolimbata Fowler
 Membracis ambigua Fairmaire
 Membracis caquetaensis Richter
 Membracis carinata Weber
 Membracis carinulata Richter
 Membracis celsa Walker
 Membracis compressa Fabricius
 Membracis confusa Fairmaire
 Membracis consobrina Costa
 Membracis continua Walker
 Membracis contornata Sakakibara, 1992
 Membracis dorsata Fabricius
 Membracis fabricii Metcalf & Wade, 1965
 Membracis fairmairi Goding, 1928
 Membracis fenestrina Schumacher
 Membracis flava Richter
 Membracis flaveola Gmelin
 Membracis foliata Linnaeus
 Membracis foliataarcuata DeGeer
 Membracis foliatafasciata
 Membracis foliatafusca DeGeer
 Membracis fonsecai Sakakibara, 1992
 Membracis formosa Richter
 Membracis fusifera Walker
 Membracis juncta Walker
 Membracis lefebvrei Fairmaire
 Membracis linki Sakakibara, 1980
 Membracis luizae Evangelista & Sakakibara, 2010
 Membracis lunata Fabricius
 Membracis mexicana Guérin-Méneville, 1829
 Membracis micaniaae Richter
 Membracis micans Buckton
 Membracis mimica
 Membracis nigra Olivier, 1792
 Membracis notulata Sakakibara, 1992
 Membracis orteguazaensis Richter
 Membracis paullula Richter
 Membracis peruviana Fairmaire
 Membracis provittata Buckton
 Membracis rectangula Costa
 Membracis robiginosa Richter
 Membracis sanguineoplaga Schmidt, 1906
 Membracis schultesii Richter
 Membracis serratipes Goding
 Membracis subulata Weber
 Membracis suctifructus Boulard & Couturier, 1991
 Membracis tectigera Olivier
 Membracis tricolor Fairmaire
 Membracis trifasciata Stål
 Membracis trimaculata Fairmaire
 Membracis zonata Fairmaire

References

Further reading

External links

 

Membracinae